The 2009–10 Atlantic Coast Conference men's basketball season was the 57th season for the league.

Duke and Maryland shared the regular season crown, while Duke won the ACC Tournament championship.

The 2010 Atlantic Coast Conference men's basketball tournament, a part of the 2009-10 NCAA Division I men's basketball season, took place from March 11–14, 2010, at the Greensboro Coliseum in Greensboro, North Carolina.  The championship game matched Duke against Georgia Tech.  Duke won 65–61, winning its 9th ACC championship in 12 years, and the most titles in ACC history at 18.  As conference champion, Duke received the ACC's automatic bid to the 2010 NCAA Tournament. Other teams to go to the tournament were Maryland, Wake Forest, Georgia Tech, Florida State, and Clemson. North Carolina made the NIT post season tournament final, but lost there to Dayton. In the Big Ten- ACC Challenge, this was the first year the ACC lost, losing 6–5 overall.

References